The Association of Broadcasting and Allied Staffs (ABS) was a British broadcasting trade union.

The organisation was founded in 1945 with the merger of the BBC Staff (Wartime) Association and the Association of BBC Engineers to form the BBC Staff Association.  It was regarded as a non-political organisation for employees of the BBC, but despite challenges from various trade unions, it remained the primary association of BBC employees.  In 1946, Leslie Littlewood was elected General Secretary, a post he was to hold until 1968.

With the creation of ITV, the association aimed to expand its remit to cover the new broadcaster, and accordingly renamed itself the Association of Broadcasting Staff (ABS) in 1956.  This was unsuccessful, but the ABS was recognised by the Independent Television Authority.

In 1963, the ABS finally affiliated to the Trades Union Congress (TUC), and was able to normalise its relations with other TUC members. It was renamed the Association of Broadcasting and Allied Staffs in 1974.

In 1972, Tony Hearn became General Secretary, and under his leadership, the union began negotiations with the National Association of Theatrical and Kine Employees.  The two unions finally merged in 1984 to form the Broadcasting and Entertainment Trades Alliance.

As of 1982, the union had a membership of 15,510, and published a monthly journal, ABStract.

General Secretaries
1945: Tom Hobson
1946: Leslie Littlewood
1968: Tom Rhys
1972: Tony Hearn

References

External links
BECTU History: ABS
Catalogue of the ABS archives, held at the Modern Records Centre, University of Warwick
Catalogue of the ABS BBC archives, held at the Modern Records Centre, University of Warwick

Broadcasting in the United Kingdom
Communications and media organisations based in the United Kingdom
Entertainment industry unions
Defunct trade unions of the United Kingdom
1945 establishments in the United Kingdom
Trade unions established in 1945
Trade unions disestablished in 1984
Trade unions based in London